Ling Ling, Ling-Ling, or Lingling may refer to:


Places
 Lingling, the former name of Yongzhou, a city in the Hunan province of China
 Lingling District, under the administration of Yongzhou

People
 Lingling (born 1997), member of the Japanese idol group BiSH
 Ling Ling Chang (born 1976), California State Senator
 Pan Lingling (born 1970), Singaporean actress
 Song Lingling (born 1996), Chinese Paralympic swimmer
 Tse Ling-ling (born 1956), Chinese actress

Characters
 A character in the animated TV series Drawn Together
 A fictional violin virtuoso created by Australian YouTuber duo Brett Yang and Eddy Chen, also known as TwoSet Violin 
 The lead character from the 1933 Chinese silent film Daybreak

Pandas
 Ling-Ling, of Ling-Ling and Hsing-Hsing, two giant pandas given to the United States by China in 1972
 Ling Ling (giant panda) (1985–2008), oldest panda in Japan before it died in 2008

Tropical cyclones
 Typhoon Lingling (2001) affected the Philippines and Vietnam
 Tropical Storm Lingling (2007)
 Tropical Storm Lingling (2014), affected the Philippines
Typhoon Lingling (2019)

Other
 Lingling dialect, an unclassified mixed Chinese dialect

See also
 Lingling-o, a type of pendant associated with late Neolithic to late Iron Age Austronesian cultures
 Linlin, a Japanese singer and former member of Morning Musume